Albert Hobbs  (August 1822 in Ogdensburg, St. Lawrence County, New York – April 11, 1897 in Malone, Franklin County, New York) was an American lawyer and politician from New York.

Life
He practiced law in Malone. He married Caroline Virginia Magee (c.1829–1891).

He was a Know Nothing member of the New York State Assembly (Franklin Co.) in 1856.

He was a Republican member of the New York State Senate (17th D.) in 1864 and 1865.

He was Judge of the Franklin County Court from 1867 to 1878. In 1884, he ran for presidential elector on the Republican ticket (pledged to James G. Blaine), but New York was carried by Democrat Grover Cleveland.

He was buried at the Morningside Cemetery in  Malone.

Sources
 The New York Civil List compiled by Franklin Benjamin Hough, Stephen C. Hutchins and Edgar Albert Werner (1870; pg. 443 and 482)
 OFFICIAL VOTE OF THE COUNTY in NYT on November 20, 1884
 Obituary Notes; ALBERT HOBBS... in NYT on April 13, 1897

External links

1822 births
1897 deaths
Republican Party New York (state) state senators
People from Malone, New York
Republican Party members of the New York State Assembly
New York (state) Know Nothings
19th-century American politicians
New York (state) state court judges
People from Ogdensburg, New York
Activists from New York (state)
19th-century American judges